Feruz Sayidov (born 7 October 1987) is an Uzbekistani Paralympic judoka. He won the gold medal in the men's 73 kg event at the 2020 Summer Paralympics held in Tokyo, Japan. He also represented Uzbekistan at the 2016 Summer Paralympics held in Rio de Janeiro, Brazil and he won the bronze medal in the men's 73 kg event.

At the 2017 Islamic Solidarity Games held in Baku, Azerbaijan, he won the silver medal in the men's −73 kg event.

References

External links 
 

1987 births
Living people
Uzbekistani male judoka
Paralympic judoka of Uzbekistan
Paralympic gold medalists for Uzbekistan
Paralympic bronze medalists for Uzbekistan
Paralympic medalists in judo
Judoka at the 2016 Summer Paralympics
Judoka at the 2020  Summer Paralympics
Medalists at the 2016 Summer Paralympics
Medalists at the 2020 Summer Paralympics
Place of birth missing (living people)
21st-century Uzbekistani people